This is a list of members of the United Kingdom House of Commons who were elected as an independent or as a member of a minor political party.

Excluded are the Speaker, who traditionally stands for re-election without party affiliation, and MPs who were elected from a major party but then defected during a parliamentary term.

Great Britain
In Great Britain, the major parties are considered to be the Conservative and Unionist Party, the Labour Party, the Liberal Democrats and its forerunners, the Liberal Unionist Party, the various National Liberal parties, National Labour, the Scottish National Party and Plaid Cymru.

Minor party and independent MPs have been rare in recent times: there have been only 13 different persons elected as such in Great Britain since 1950.

1950–present

(b) = by-election

In 1945 and 1950, MacLeod was the nominee of the Ross and Cromarty Liberal Association, but this was not connected the Liberal Party nationally. He was a supporter of Winston Churchill and from 1951 became an official National Liberal and Conservative candidate and MP.
Robertson had been an official Conservative MP for the seat since 1950 but resigned the party whip in 1959 in opposition to the Government's Scottish policy and fought the election without a Conservative opponent.
Davies had been the Labour MP for Merthyr Tydfil since 1934 but in the run-up to the 1970 general election he was deselected by his local party on grounds of age. He stood again against the new Labour candidate and won.
Taverne was the sitting Labour MP for Lincoln who was increasingly at odds with his ever more left-wing local party. In 1973 he was deselected as an official Labour candidate. He resigned from Parliament and fought the ensuing by-election as a Democratic Labour candidate against the official Labour nominee, holding the seat in the February 1974 general election but losing in October 1974.
Milne was the sitting Labour MP for Blyth who was deselected by his local party in disputes surrounding Labour Party corruption in the North East. He stood against the official Labour nominee and won the seat, but lost in the October 1974 general election.
Bell, a BBC News war reporter, was nominated as a single issue candidate in opposition to the "sleaze" allegations surrounding the sitting Conservative MP for Tatton, Neil Hamilton. Both the Labour and Liberal Democrat parties withdrew their candidates in support of Bell.
Taylor was the nominee of Independent Kidderminster Hospital and Health Concern, a party formed around the single issue of keeping the casualty unit at Kidderminster General Hospital. In both the 2001 and 2005 general elections his candidature was not opposed by the Liberal Democrats.
Law was the sitting Labour Member of the Welsh Assembly for Blaenau Gwent who stood for the Westminster Parliament following a dispute over the selection of the official Labour candidate, Maggie Jones, involving an all women shortlist, a process that was opposed by many members and officials in the local party, including the retiring Labour MP Llew Smith.
Galloway was the Labour MP for Glasgow Hillhead from 1987 and then Glasgow Kelvin following name and boundary changes in 1997. In 2003, he was expelled from the Labour Party when a party body found that he had brought the party into disrepute over the 2003 invasion of Iraq. He helped form Respect and challenged incumbent Bethnal Green & Bow Labour MP Oona King who had supported the war.
Davies had been Peter Law's electoral agent in the general election.

1919–1950

(b) = by-election

Stood as a "Labour Party" candidate, but without the backing of the Labour Party and did not take the Labour whip.
Due to an oversight, Maclean's candidature was not endorsed by the Labour Party. Once elected, he immediately took the Labour whip.

1832–1918 
Excluded during this period are MPs from the Conservative and Liberal Parties, the Labour Party but not the Labour Representation Committee, the Liberal Unionist Party, the Whigs and the Tories. Before 1885 it becomes increasingly difficult to identify which MPs were independent, and F. W. S. Craig's classification is used.

Northern Ireland
MPs from the Democratic Unionist Party, Sinn Féin, Social Democratic and Labour Party or Ulster Unionist Party, including those Ulster Unionists who stood as part of the Conservative Party, are excluded. While these four are all currently regarded as major parties, each of these parties has at times held only a single seat (or none, in the cases of Sinn Féin, the SDLP, and the UUP), and for many years Sinn Féin was a banned organisation and did not contest elections. Also excluded are MPs from the Nationalist Party, which dissolved in 1977 but was formerly considered a major party.

(b) = by-election

Hermon was an Ulster Unionist MP for North Down from 2001 to 2010 when she left the party in opposition to the party's electoral pact with the NI Conservatives to form UCU-NF. She retained her seat at the 2010 general election, and at the next two general elections.
Kilfedder was an Ulster Unionist MP for Belfast West 1964-1966 and for North Down until 1977 when he left the party in opposition to Enoch Powell's proposals for integration over devolution. Kilfedder sat as an Independent Unionist until 1980, then formed the Ulster Popular Unionist Party which primarily served as a vehicle for him and his supporters.
 Carron was elected on the issue of the 1981 Irish Hunger Strike, standing as a "Anti H-Block/Proxy Political Prisoner" after new laws banned the nomination of any of the hunger strikers. He did not take his seat in the House of Commons. From 1982 onwards he was standing as a Sinn Féin in elections, including his unsuccessful defence of this seat in the 1983 general election.
Sands was the most prominent of the Irish Hunger Strikers and incarcerated at HM Prison Maze at the time of his election, though he was ideologically opposed to taking his seat in the Commons.
Maguire was the product of an electoral pact amongst Irish Nationalists. Although in the tradition of the prior Unity pact, he did not use the label (though is sometimes listed as a Unity MP). He did take his seat in the House of Commons, though only attended rarely.
Dunlop was the Vanguard Progressive Unionist Party MP for Mid Ulster from February 1974, until the party split over leader William Craig's proposals for power-sharing with the Social Democratic and Labour Party in 1976. One faction, to which Dunlop belonged, formed the United Ulster Unionist Party, under which banner he stood and sat for the constituency until standing down at the 1983 election.
Craig and Bradford were the Vanguard Progressive Unionist Party MPs for Belfast East & Belfast South respectively from February 1974 and stayed in Vanguard following the 1976 party split, then merging the party into the Ulster Unionists in February 1978.
In 1971 Paisley merged the Protestant Unionist Party into the new Democratic Unionist Party.
Fitt was elected as a Republican Labour Party in 1966 and 1970, but later in the latter year he left the party and co-founded the Social Democratic and Labour Party, for which he sat as an MP until 1980, when he left that party and sat in the Commons as an Independent Socialist until his defeat in 1983.
Little was elected as an official Ulster Unionist in the 1939 Down by-election. Prior to the 1945 general election he resigned from the party in protest at being subject to a reselection due to the retirement of Viscount Castlereagh, the other official Unionist MP, and held his seat as an Independent Ulster Unionist. He died in 1946.

Ireland 
All MPs are listed except those from the Irish Unionist Alliance (affiliated to the Conservative Party during this period), the Nationalist Party, Sinn Féin, the Liberal Party, the Liberal Unionist Party and the Home Rule candidates.

See also
 Non-attached members of the European Parliament

References

British Parliamentary By-Elections since 1945

F. W. S. Craig, British Parliamentary Election Statistics 1832-1987

Minor
 
Minor